Mariann Domonkos (born February 12, 1958) is a Hungarian-born Canadian table tennis player. She competed in the women's singles event at the 1988 Summer Olympics.

References

External links
 
 
 
 

1958 births
Living people
Canadian female table tennis players
Pan American Games medalists in table tennis
Pan American Games gold medalists for Canada
Pan American Games silver medalists for Canada
Pan American Games bronze medalists for Canada
Table tennis players from Budapest
Table tennis players at the 1979 Pan American Games
Table tennis players at the 1983 Pan American Games
Table tennis players at the 1987 Pan American Games
Olympic table tennis players of Canada
Table tennis players at the 1988 Summer Olympics
Medalists at the 1983 Pan American Games
Medalists at the 1987 Pan American Games